The Aviv String Quartet was founded in Israel in 1997, and has performed internationally for over 15 years. Among the quartet's various awards is the DaimlerChrysler Grand Prize at the 3rd Melbourne International Chamber Music Competition and top prizes at the Bordeaux and Schubert Competitions.  The Aviv Quartet has recorded 3 discs of Shostakovich on Dalia Classics (available on iTunes and emusic) and 2 Naxos discs of Hoffmeister and Schulhoff.  Recent highlights include a complete Shostakovich cycle at the 2007 Verbier Festival, debuts at the Zurich Tonhalle and Brussels Palais des Beaux-Arts and return visits to Wigmore Hall. 

Members
Violin I:    Sergey Ostrovsky
Violin II:   Philippe Villafranca 
Viola:       Noemie Bialobroda
Cello:       Daniel Mitnitsky 

Former Members
Violin II:      Evgenia Epshtein (1997-2005)
Viola:       Timur Yakubov (2011-2015)
Viola:       Shuli Waterman (1997-2009)
Viola:       Nathan Braude (2009-2011)
Cello:       Iris Jortner (1997-2002)
Cello:       Rachel Mercer (2002-2010)

References

String quartets
Israeli classical music groups
Musical groups established in 1997